Teuthrania was a town in the western part of ancient Mysia, and the name of its district about the river Caicus, which was believed to be derived from a legendary Mysian king Teuthras. This king is said to have adopted, as his son and successor, Telephus, a son of Heracles; and Eurypylus, the son of Telephus, appears in the Odyssey as the ruler of the Ceteii. The town was situated between Elaea, Pitane, and Atarneus. The nearby towns of Halisarna, Pergamum, and Teuthrania had been given by the Persian king Darius I to the Spartan king Demaratus about the year 486 BCE for his help in the expedition against Greece. Demaratus's descendants continued to rule these cities at the beginning of the 4th century BCE. During the withdrawal of Pergamum from The March of the Ten Thousand, it was attacked by, among others, troops from Halisarna and Teuthrania under command of Procles, son of Demaratus. In the Hellenica, Xenophon relates that Teuthrania, together with Pergamum, Halisarna, Gambrium, Palaegambrium, Myrina and Gryneium were delivered by their rulers to the army that, under the command of the Spartan Thimbron, around the year 399 BCE, had come to the area to try to liberate the Greek colonies from the Persian domain.

Its site is located near modern Kalerga, in İzmir Province, Turkey.

According to the lost epic poem of the Cypria, Teuthrania was mistaken for Troy in the Achaean’s first expedition to reach the city.

References

Populated places in ancient Mysia
Former populated places in Turkey
Locations in Greek mythology
Bergama District
History of İzmir Province